The Galuh Kingdom was an ancient Sundanese kingdom located in the eastern part of Tatar Pasundan (now West Java province and Banyumasan region of Central Java province), present-day Indonesia. It was established following the end of the Tarumanagara kingdom around the 7th century. Traditionally the kingdom was associated with Eastern Priangan cultural region, around the Citanduy and Cimanuk rivers, with territory spanned from Citarum river on the west, Pamali and Serayu river on the east. Its capital was first located in Karangkamulyan, Ciamis Regency, then Saunggalah, Kuningan, and Kawali, near today Ciamis City. The etymology of "galuh" is Old Sundanese and Kawi word for "gemstone".

History 
Most of the knowledge about this kingdom was collected from local Sundanese myth and folktales, transmitted through Pantun Sunda oral tradition. The Sundanese epic folktale of Ciung Wanara took place in this kingdom. Scarce historical records include Carita Parahyangan and Wangsakerta manuscripts composed in later period. The only stone inscription was 14th century Astana Gede inscription discovered in Kawali, believed to be the former capital of Galuh. From all these sources, it was concluded that Galuh was a Hindu kingdom, the predecessor of later Sunda Pajajaran kingdom. It was about the same period as Javanese Mataram kingdom.

According to the Wangsakerta manuscript, Galuh was a vassal of Tarumanagara. After the fall of Tarumanagara, its dynastic patriarch, Wretikandayun of Galuh, separated his realm from Sunda kingdom in the west. Since the crown prince of Galuh was the son-in-law of Queen Shima of Kalingga, a Hindu kingdom in Central Java, Wretikandayun, supported by Kalingga, demanded that the remnant of what was known as Tarumanagara's territory be divided into two kingdoms. Finding himself in an unfortunate position and unwilling to risk a civil war, King Tarusbawa of Sunda granted Wretikandayun's demand. In 670, Tarumanagara was divided into two kingdoms: the Sunda Kingdom in the west, and the Galuh Kingdom in the east, separated by the Tarum (Citarum) River.

Galuh continued to exist as individual kingdom as the counterpart of Sunda until it was absorbed and incorporated within Sunda kingdom around the 10th century. Galuh and the Sunda kingdom, another Sundanese kingdom, established the United Kingdom of Sunda and Galuh.  Its centre in Kawali become the court capital until the 15th century when Sri Baduga Maharaja shifted the capital to Pakuan Pajajaran. In later period, during the expansion of Mataram Sultanate, the menak (nobles) of Eastern Priangan region (Ciamis, Tasikmalaya, Garut, Kuningan and Majalengka), claimed to hold the legacy and prestige of this ancient kingdom.

Cultural Heritage
Cangkuang temple located in Leles, Garut Regency is estimated to have been built during Galuh kingdom era. It is the only reconstructed Hindu temple in West Java.

List of monarchs

See also

 United Kingdom of Sunda and Galuh
 List of monarchs of Java

References

Precolonial states of Indonesia
669 establishments
History of West Java